Discovery Channel (Europe) is the Pan-European version of the Discovery Channel.

Over the years, the Discovery Channel has been split into many different channels for specific regions. Most language regions in Western Europe now have their own versions of the channel, and the Pan-European is therefore now mostly available in countries in Central and Eastern Europe.

The channel is broadcast from the United Kingdom and holds an Ofcom licence. The channel was registered as "Discovery Channel Europe" until August 2006, when it changed its name to "Discovery (Central & Eastern Europe inc. Russia)". Later it changed back to Discovery Channel (Europe).

Discovery Channel (Europe) was launched from the UK in 1989. It launched on the Astra satellite in 1993. Eventually it split into different channels for different markets:
Discovery Channel Africa
Discovery Channel Bulgaria
Discovery Channel Denmark
Discovery Channel Estonia
Discovery Channel Finland
Discovery Channel Flanders
Discovery Channel France
Discovery Channel Germany
Discovery Channel Hungary
Discovery Channel Italy
Discovery Channel Latvia
Discovery Channel Netherlands
Discovery Channel Norway
Discovery Channel Poland
Discovery Channel Portugal
Discovery Channel Russia
Discovery Channel Serbia
Discovery Channel Slovenia
Discovery Channel Spain
Discovery Channel Sweden
Discovery Channel Turkey
Discovery Channel UK and Ireland

Some of the countries that still receive the European version are Cyprus, Greece, Africa, Malta, parts of the Balkans and Central Europe.

Logo

References

Europe
Television channels and stations established in 1989
Television stations in Malta
Television channels in North Macedonia
Warner Bros. Discovery EMEA